The 2015 North Carolina Central Eagles football team represented North Carolina Central University in the 2015 NCAA Division I FCS football season. They were led by second-year head coach Jerry Mack. The Eagles played their home games at O'Kelly–Riddick Stadium. They were a member of the Mid-Eastern Athletic Conference (MEAC). They finished the season 8–3, 7–1 in MEAC play to finish in a three-way tie for the MEAC title with North Carolina A&T and Bethune-Cookman. 2015 was the first year the MEAC champion abstained from the FCS playoffs. Due to their head-to-head loss to Bethune-Cookman and lack of FCS Division non-conference victories, they were not invited to the newly-formed Celebration Bowl.

Schedule

Source: Schedule

References

North Carolina Central
North Carolina Central Eagles football seasons
Mid-Eastern Athletic Conference football champion seasons
North Carolina Central Eagles football